The non-mevalonate pathway—also appearing as the mevalonate-independent pathway and the 2-C-methyl-D-erythritol 4-phosphate/1-deoxy-D-xylulose 5-phosphate (MEP/DOXP) pathway—is an alternative metabolic pathway for the biosynthesis of the isoprenoid precursors isopentenyl pyrophosphate (IPP) and dimethylallyl pyrophosphate (DMAPP). The currently preferred name for this pathway is the MEP pathway, since MEP is the first committed metabolite on the route to IPP.

Isoprenoid precursor biosynthesis
The classical mevalonate pathway (MVA pathway or HMG-CoA reductase pathway) is a metabolic pathway for the biosynthesis of isoprenoid precursors: IPP and DMAPP. The MVA pathway is present in most eukaryotes and some bacteria. IPP and DMAPP serve as the basis for the biosynthesis of isoprenoid (terpenoid) molecules used in processes as diverse as protein prenylation, cell membrane maintenance, the synthesis of hormones, protein anchoring and N-glycosylation in all three domains of life.

Most bacteria, plants, and apicomplexan protozoa—such as malaria parasites—are able to produce isoprenoid precursors using an alternative non-mevalonate pathway called the MEP pathway. Plants and many photosynthetic protozoa retain both the MVA pathway and the MEP pathway. IPP/DMAPP biosynthesis via the MEP pathway takes place in plastid organelles, while the biosynthesis via the MVA pathway takes place in the cytoplasm. Bacteria such as Escherichia coli have been engineered for co-expressing both the MEP and the MVA pathway. Distribution of the metabolic fluxes between the MEP and the MVA pathway can be studied using 13C-glucose isotopomers. Bacteria that use the MEP pathway include important pathogens such Mycobacterium tuberculosis.

Reactions
The reactions of the non-mevalonate pathway are as follows, taken primarily from Eisenreich and co-workers, except where the bold labels are additional local abbreviations to assist in connecting the table to the scheme above:

Inhibition and other pathway research
DXP reductoisomerase (also known as: DXR, DOXP reductoisomerase, IspC, MEP synthase), is a key enzyme in the MEP pathway. It can be inhibited by the natural product 
fosmidomycin, which is under study as a starting point to develop a candidate antibacterial or antimalarial drug.

The intermediate, HMB-PP, is a natural activator of human Vγ9/Vδ2 T cells, the major γδ T cell population in peripheral blood, and cells that "play a crucial role in the immune response to microbial pathogens".

 IspH inhibitors: non-mevalonate Metabolic pathway that is essential for most bacteria but absent in humans, making it an ideal target for antibiotic development. This pathway, called methyl-D-erythritol phosphate (MEP) or non-mevalonate pathway, is responsible for biosynthesis of isoprenoids—molecules required for cell survival in most pathogenic bacteria and hence will be helpful in most usually antibacterial resistant bacteria.

References

Further reading
  RSC review; uses MAP synthase nomenclature.
 
 IspH inhibitors: non-mevalonate Metabolic pathway that is essential for most bacteria but absent in humans, making it an ideal target for antibiotic development. This pathway, called methyl-D-erythritol phosphate (MEP) or non-mevalonate pathway, is responsible for biosynthesis of isoprenoids—molecules required for cell survival in most pathogenic bacteria

Metabolic pathways
Cell biology